Ned Arnel "Carlos" Mencía (born October 22, 1967) is a Honduran-American comedian, writer, and actor. His style of comedy is often political and involves issues of race relations, Latin American culture, criminal justice, and social class. He is best known as the host of the Comedy Central show Mind of Mencia (2005–2008). Around the time of the show's cancellation, several comedians accused Mencía of plagiarism and stealing jokes.

Early life
Ned Arnel Mencía was born in San Pedro Sula on October 22, 1967, the son of Mexican mother Magdelena Mencía and Honduran father Roberto Holness. He has 16 older siblings and one younger sibling. At the time of his birth, his mother was engaged in a domestic dispute with his father, and she subsequently refused to give Mencía his biological father's surname. Out of respect for his father, he later began using the Holness surname anyway, and did so until the age of 18. He moved to the U.S. as a child and was raised Catholic in East Los Angeles by his aunt Consuelo and uncle Pablo Mencía. By his own admission, staying out of trouble was difficult while growing up, but his family helped him excel in school and stay out of gangs. He dealt drugs and robbed a house when he was 19 years old. He attended Garfield High School in Los Angeles County, and later majored in electrical engineering at California State University, Los Angeles; however, he dropped out to pursue a career in comedy after a successful performance at an open mic night at The Laugh Factory. In 1988, at the suggestion of Comedy Store owner Mitzi Shore, he began using the first name "Carlos" to appeal to Mexican audiences.

Career

Mencia performed at venerated LA stand-up venues such as The Comedy Store and The L.A. Cabaret. His success in these venues led to appearances on The Arsenio Hall Show and Buscando Estrellas, where he attained the title "International Comedy Grand Champion." Then, in 1994, Mencia was chosen to host HBO's latino comedy showcase Loco Slam.

Mencia followed up Loco Slam by hosting Funny is Funny! on Galavision in 1998. He would continue to do stand-up, including a successful tour in 2001 with Freddy Soto and Pablo Francisco, "The Three Amigos." Mencia also did two half-hour specials on HBO, the second of which won him a CableACE Award for Best Stand-Up Comedy Special. After the release of his first comedy album by Warner Records, Take A Joke America, Mencia performed his break-out performance on Comedy Central Presents in 2002.

By the time his career began to take off in the early 2000s, Mencia was also working as an actor doing guest appearances in the television shows Moesha and The Shield, and starring in the film Outta Time and the animated show The Proud Family.

In 2002, he performed on Comedy Central Presents. In March 2005, Comedy Central announced Mencia's own half-hour comedy show, Mind of Mencia. The show mixed Mencia's stand up comedy with sketch comedy, much like Dave Chappelle's Chappelle's Show. The show achieved moderate success in its first season and was brought back for a second season in the spring of 2006, becoming Comedy Central's second highest-rated program behind South Park. It was brought back for a third season that summer before being cancelled in 2008. Mind of Mencia was produced by Nedlos, a portmanteau of Mencia's birth name and the name he took prior to naturalizing in the US.

Mencia was sometimes a guest on the Opie and Anthony radio show on XM Satellite Radio and CBS Radio. He took part in the first Opie and Anthony's Traveling Virus Comedy Tour in 2006.

Mencia starred in a Super Bowl XLI commercial for Bud Light. In November 2009, Mencia began appearing in commercials for a weight-loss product called Belly Burner.

Mencia went on a 2011 stand-up comedy tour, including dates at the Improv in Schaumburg, Illinois, on June 24 and 25, and ending in Las Vegas at Treasure Island on September 16, 2011.

Mencia was a co-founder of the restaurant chain Maggie Rita's, and a co-owner of several locations. By January 2013, Mencia's restaurants had closed amid poor reviews, though one franchised location continued to license the name.

Controversies

Public reception
In 2006, Maxim named Mencia one of the worst comedians of all time. Mike Byoff of Gawker said of Mencia, "Not only does he steal jokes from classic comedians but he's needlessly racist and had no sense of comedic timing whatsoever."

A 2010 article in The Wall Street Journal noted that Mencia, Dane Cook, and Jay Leno were three of the most popular stand-ups that were hated by fellow comedians.

Accusations of plagiarism
In 2005, comedian Joe Rogan wrote a post on his website publicly accusing Mencia of being a plagiarist, alleging that Mencia stole jokes from a number of comedians. On February 10, 2007, Rogan confronted Mencia on stage at the Comedy Store on Sunset Boulevard and accused him of plagiarism. Rogan posted a video of the altercation, along with audio and video clips from other comedians including George Lopez, Bob Levy, Bobby Lee, and Ari Shaffir, among others. Rogan has also posted audio and video clips of Mencia's interviews and joke routines comparing Mencia's routines to those of other comedians on his blog.

Comedian George Lopez also accused Mencia of plagiarizing his material. In an interview on The Howard Stern Show, Lopez accused Mencia of plagiarizing 13 minutes of his material in Mencia's HBO special. He also claimed he had a physical altercation with Mencia over the alleged plagiarism. The only joke that Lopez has publicly specified was stolen and used on Mencia's HBO special was a Taco Bell joke. Comedian Ted Sarnowski countered this claim, stating that the joke he performed on radio in 1988 was later taken and used without permission by Lopez, the radio station's resident comic. Sarnowski claims to have given Mencia permission to use the joke.

Mencia has also been accused of stealing a routine from Bill Cosby. In his special, No Strings Attached, Mencia performs a bit about a father who spends years training his son for a career as a football player, only to see the son say "I love you, Mom!" at his moment of televised victory. Cosby performed a similar bit in his concert film Bill Cosby: Himself and wrote briefly on the subject in his book Fatherhood. Mencia told the Los Angeles Times that he had never seen the film but regretted the similarities between his and Cosby's jokes.

Mencia addressed the issue of plagiarism in two hour-long interviews with comic Marc Maron on his podcast, WTF with Marc Maron, in May 2010. In 2011, Mencia stated in an interview that he had been in therapy due to accusations of plagiarism.

Hurricane Katrina remarks
In February 2009, Mencia was dropped from the Krewe of Orpheus' celebrity lineup for New Orleans Mardi Gras, citing inappropriate comments he made in the aftermath of Hurricane Katrina. Mencia remarked during his stand-up: "I'm glad Hurricane Katrina happened. It taught us an important lesson: Black people can't swim."

Personal life
Mencia married his wife, Amy, in 2003. They reside in Los Angeles and have one son named Lucas Pablo Mencia.

In Popular Culture
In the South Park episode Fishsticks (South Park), the portrayed character of Mencia claims to have made the "fishsticks" joke, however, the joke was made by Jimmy. Rapper Kanye West kills Mencia later in the episode.

Filmography

Film

Television

Mencia has also appeared on Comic Relief, and hosted Loco Slam in 1994, Latino Laugh Festival in 1997, Funny is Funny! in 1998, and Uncensored Comedy: That's Not Funny in 2003.

Discography

Albums
 Take a Joke America (2001)
 America Rules (2002)
 Unmerciful (2003)
 Spanglish (2006)

Albums and DVDs
 Not for the Easily Offended (2003)
 Down to the Nitty Gritty (2004)
 No Strings Attached (2006)
 The Best of Funny is Funny (2007)
 Performance Enhanced (2008)
 Mind of Mencia Season 1 (2006)
 Mind of Mencia Season 2 (2007)
 Mind of Mencia Season 3 (2007)
 Mind Of Mencia Season 4 (2008)
 Carlos Mencia: New Territory (2011)

References

External links

 
 
 Mind of Mencia  at ComedyCentral.com

1967 births
Living people
21st-century American comedians
American male comedians
American male film actors
American male television actors
American male actors of Mexican descent
American sketch comedians
American stand-up comedians
Comedians from California
Hispanic and Latino American male actors
Honduran emigrants to the United States
Honduran male actors
Honduran people of Mexican descent
Male actors from Los Angeles County, California
People from San Pedro Sula
People involved in plagiarism controversies
United Service Organizations entertainers